Kondrac is a municipality and village in Benešov District in the Central Bohemian Region of the Czech Republic. It has about 500 inhabitants.

Administrative parts
Villages of Dub and Krasovice are administrative parts of Kondrac.

Notable people
Franz Hauser (1794–1870), singer and voice teacher

References

Villages in Benešov District